The 1997 Hamburg state election was held on 21 September 1997 to elect the members of the 16th Hamburg Parliament. The incumbent government of the Social Democratic Party (SPD) and Statt Party under First Mayor Henning Voscherau was defeated as Statt lost all its seats. The SPD subsequently formed a coalition with the Green Alternative List (GAL). Voscherau declined to run for re-election as First Mayor due to the SPD's poor performance, and fellow SPD member Ortwin Runde succeeded him.

Parties
The table below lists parties represented in the 15th Hamburg Parliament.

Election result

|-
! colspan="2" | Party
! Votes
! %
! +/-
! Seats 
! +/-
! Seats %
|-
| bgcolor=| 
| align=left | Social Democratic Party (SPD)
| align=right| 297,901
| align=right| 36.2
| align=right| 4.2
| align=right| 54
| align=right| 4
| align=right| 44.6
|-
| bgcolor=| 
| align=left | Christian Democratic Union (CDU)
| align=right| 252,640
| align=right| 30.7
| align=right| 5.6
| align=right| 46
| align=right| 10
| align=right| 38.0
|-
| bgcolor=| 
| align=left | Green Alternative List (GAL)
| align=right| 114,387
| align=right| 13.9
| align=right| 0.4
| align=right| 21
| align=right| 2
| align=right| 17.4
|-
! colspan=8|
|-
| bgcolor=| 
| align=left | German People's Union (DVU)
| align=right| 40,957
| align=right| 5.0
| align=right| 2.2
| align=right| 0
| align=right| ±0
| align=right| 0
|-
| bgcolor=darkblue| 
| align=left | Statt Party (STATT)
| align=right| 31,401
| align=right| 3.8
| align=right| 1.8
| align=right| 0
| align=right| 8
| align=right| 0
|-
| bgcolor=| 
| align=left | Free Democratic Party (FDP)
| align=right| 28,664
| align=right| 3.5
| align=right| 0.7
| align=right| 0
| align=right| ±0
| align=right| 0
|-
| bgcolor=| 
| align=left | The Republicans (REP)
| align=right| 15,207
| align=right| 1.8
| align=right| 3.0
| align=right| 0
| align=right| ±0
| align=right| 0
|-
| 
| align=left | League of Citizens (BfB)
| align=right| 10,914
| align=right| 1.3
| align=right| 1.3
| align=right| 0
| align=right| ±0
| align=right| 0
|-
| bgcolor=|
| align=left | Others
| align=right| 30,440
| align=right| 3.7
| align=right| 
| align=right| 0
| align=right| ±0
| align=right| 0
|-
! align=right colspan=2| Total
! align=right| 822,511
! align=right| 100.0
! align=right| 
! align=right| 121
! align=right| ±0
! align=right| 
|-
! align=right colspan=2| Voter turnout
! align=right| 
! align=right| 68.7
! align=right| 1.2
! align=right| 
! align=right| 
! align=right| 
|}

See also
Elections in Germany
Elections in Hamburg
Hamburg state elections in the Weimar Republic

References

1997 elections in Germany
1997 state election
1997
September 1997 events in Europe